The carotid sheath is a condensation of the deep cervical fascia enveloping multiple vital neurovascular structures of the neck, including the common and internal carotid arteries, the internal jugular vein, the vagus nerve (CN X), ansa cervicalis, and sympathetic trunk. The carotid sheath helps protects the structures contained therein.

Anatomy
One carotid sheath is situated on each side of the neck, extending between the skull and the arch of the aorta. It extends between the base of the skull superiorly, and level of the first rib and sternum inferiorly (varying between the levels of C7 and T4).

Structure 
The carotid sheath is a fibrous connective tissue formation surrounding several important structures of the neck. It is thicker around the arteries than around the vein, allowing the vein to expand.

The three major fascial layers in the neck contribute to the carotid sheath: the investing fascia, the pretracheal fascia, and the prevertebral fascia. The carotid sheath has limited loose connective tissue.

Contents
Structures contained within the carotid sheath include the:
 common carotid artery and internal carotid artery,
 internal jugular vein,
 vagus nerve (CN X) and recurrent laryngeal nerve,
 parts of glossopharyngeal (CN IX), accessory (CN XI), and hypoglossal (CN XII) cranial nerves (these cranial nerves are only present in the upper part of the carotid sheath and subsequently exit the carotid sheath),
 sympathetic trunk,
 ansa cervicalis,
 deep cervical lymph nodes.

Arrangement 
The ansa cervicalis is embedded in the anterior wall of sheath.

The sympathetic trunk is situated posterior to the common carotid artery; the cervical part of the sympathetic trunk is embedded in prevertebral fascia immediately posterior to the sheath.

Relations
The carotid sheath occurs at the level of the oropharynx.

The carotid sheath is situated at each lateral boundary of the retropharyngeal space, deep to the sternocleidomastoid muscle. The pharynx is situated medially to the carotid sheath, (in the suprahyoid region) the parotid gland laterally to it, (in the suprahyoid region the infratemporal fossa anteriorly to it, and the prevertebral fascia posteriorly to it.

Superiorly, the carotid sheath encircles the margins of the carotid canal and jugular foramen. Inferiorly, it terminates at the aortic arch; it is continuous inferiorly with the axillary sheath at the venous angle.

Function 
The carotid sheath acts to protect and separate the structures contained within.

Clinical significance 
The carotid sheath may act as a conduit for infections, although this is rare due to the limited connective tissue.

Additional images

See also 
 Axillary fascia

References

External links 
 
 
 
 Cross section at tufts.edu

Human head and neck